2/5 or  may refer to:

February 5 (month-day date notation)
2 May (day-month date notation)
2nd Battalion, 5th Marines
The fraction, two fifths

See also
4/10 (disambiguation)